The Eikon Exhibition Centre in an events venue at Balmoral Park, Lisburn, Northern Ireland. The name comes from the Greek word "eikon" (English: image).

History
The centre, which was developed by the Royal Ulster Agricultural Society, opened in September 2015. It was significantly expanded with the completion of the Dr E F Logan Hall in spring 2018.

Facilities
The Eikon Exhibition Centre is Northern Ireland's largest events campus, set on a 65-acre site and with over 10,000 square metres of indoor, flexible event space.

Notes

References

External links

Exhibition and conference centres in Northern Ireland
Buildings and structures completed in 2015
Buildings and structures in Lisburn
Event venues in Northern Ireland
21st-century architecture in Northern Ireland